Maurice de Marsan (1852 in Bordeaux - 29 April 1929 in Paris) was a French poet, novelist, film director and screenwriter

Filmography (selection) 
 1909 : J'épouserai ma cousine
 1921 : Le Traquenard
 1921 : L’Assommoir
 Serge Panine (1922)
 The King of Paris (1923)
 1923 : La Nuit rouge
 1924 : la Main qui a tué
 1925 : La Justicière

References

Liens external links 
 
 24 films liés à Maurice de Marsan sur CinéRessources.net
 Maurice de Marsan on 

French film directors
20th-century French screenwriters
Writers from Bordeaux
1852 births
1929 deaths
Mass media people from Bordeaux